A Dona do Pedaço (English title: Sweet Diva) is a Brazilian telenovela produced and broadcast by Globo. It premiered on 20 May 2019, replacing O Sétimo Guardião, and ended on 22 November 2019, replaced by Amor de Mãe. It was written by Walcyr Carrasco, with the collaboration of Márcio Haiduck, Nelson Nadotti and Vinícius Vianna; with the direction of André Barros, Bernardo Sá, Bruno Martins Moraes, Caetano Caruso and Vicente Kubrusly, general direction of Luciano Sabino and artistic direction of Amora Mautner.

It stars Juliana Paes, Marcos Palmeira, Agatha Moreira, Paolla Oliveira, Nathalia Dill, Sérgio Guizé, Caio Castro and Reynaldo Gianecchini in the main roles, with special participation of Fernanda Montenegro.

Plot 
In 1999, in the fictional city of Rio Vermelho, the families of vigilantes Ramirez and Matheus lived in war for generations until Maria da Paz (Juliana Paes) and Amadeu (Marcos Palmeira) fell in love and sealed a peace agreement between them. On the wedding day, however, Amadeu is mysteriously shot and the war is restarted, causing Maria to flee to São Paulo without knowing that she is pregnant. The mothers of both clans, concerned for their children, make a deal and lie to the families that both Maria and Amadeu are dead, but in revenge Amadeu's father orders Maria's nieces to be murdered. Both girls end up miraculously saving themselves: Fabiana ends up in a convent and Virginia lives on the streets until she is adopted by the rich couple Beatriz (Natália do Vale) and Otávio (José de Abreu). Twenty years later, Maria becomes a successful baking entrepreneur thanks to family recipes, although she never gets along with her daughter, Josiane (Agatha Moreira), who criticizes her behavior and appearance. Josiane knows that she needs her mother to achieve the social projection she needs to become an influencer, and devises a plan with the help of Régis (Reynaldo Gianecchini). Maria reunites with Amadeu and discovers the lie that separated them, but they are prevented from resuming their romance when his wife, Gilda (Heloísa Jorge), becomes seriously ill. Devastated, Maria marries Régis, without imagining that he is her daughter's partner in the plan to get her hands on her entire fortune.

Meanwhile Maria's nieces took different paths: Vivi (Paolla Oliveira) became famous on the internet for her charisma, being everything Josiane always dreamed of, and lives an overwhelming romance with Chiclete (Sérgio Guizé) without knowing that he is a hitman sent to execute her, although he also loves her. Fabiana (Nathalia Dill), on the other hand, spent a miserable life in the convent and, upon discovering that Vivi is her sister, decides to ruin her life, nourished by the hatred of the different life opportunities they had. In addition, Fabiana also begins to threaten Otávio and Josiane by discovering their secrets.

Cast 
 Juliana Paes as Maria da Paz Sobral Ramirez
 Marcos Palmeira as Amadeu da Penha Matheus
 Agatha Moreira as Josiane "Jô" Sobral Ramirez Matheus
 Reynaldo Gianecchini as Régis Mantovani
 Paolla Oliveira as Virgínia Sobral Ramirez / Virgínia Guedes "Vivi" 
 Nathalia Dill as Fabiana Sobral Ramirez / Fabiana do Rosário
 Sérgio Guizé as Ricardo Martins Ramirez "Chiclete"
 Caio Castro as Rock Souza Macondo
 Malvino Salvador as Agno Aguiar
 Deborah Evelyn as Lyris Mantovani Aguiar
 Heloísa Jorge as Gilda Cunha Matheus
 Lee Taylor as Camilo D'ávila Muniz
 Monica Iozzi as Kim Ventura
 Anderson Di Rizzi as Márcio Sorrentino
 Lucy Ramos as Sílvia Cunha
 Rainer Cadete as Teodoro "Téo" Pacheco
 Marco Nanini as Eusébio Macondo / Eustáquio Macondo Júnior
 Rosi Campos as Dorotéia de Souza Macondo "Dodô"
 Natália do Vale as Beatriz Andrade Guedes
 José de Abreu as Otávio Guedes
 Betty Faria as Cornélia Macondo Ferreira
 Tonico Pereira as João Francisco Ferreira "Chico"
 Suely Franco as Marlene da Conceição Valadares
 Nívea Maria as Evelina Sobral Ramirez
 Ary Fontoura as Antero Valadares
 Guilherme Leicam as Leandro Ramirez Martins "Mão Santa"
 Rafael Queiroz as Rael Matheus
 Nathalia Timberg as Gladys Mantovani
 Rosamaria Murtinho as Linda Andrade
 Rosane Gofman as Ellen da Rocha
 Glamour Garcia as Rarisson Souza Macondo / Britney Souza Macondo
 Pedro Carvalho as Abel da Gama Ferronha
 Bruno Bevan as José Hélio de Souza Macondo "Zé Hélio"
 Carol Garcia as Sabrina de Souza
 Mel Maia as Cássia Mantovani Aguiar
 João Gabriel D'Aleluia as Carlito Cunha Matheus
 Cadu Libonati as Raul Pacheco "Merlin"
 Branca Previliato as Priscila de Albuquerque "Pri"
 Betto Marques as Antonio "Tonho" Ribeiro
 Osvaldo Mil as Cosme Pereira
 Duio Botta as Jardel
 Mariano Junior as Sávio
 Duda Nagle as Paulo Roberto Vidigal
 Bruna Hamú as Joana Fernandes
 Catarina de Carvalho as Alba
 Felipe Titto as Abdias
 Gláucio Gomes as Nicolas
 Thiago Thomé as Adriano 
 Fernando Zili as André
 Pablo Titto as Tico
 Luciana Fernandes as Jeniffer
 Jardel Camelo as Beto
 Bruno Barboza as Eurico
 Samira Lochter as Sueli
 Chan Suan as Naomi
 Dani Guimarães as Lígia

Guest stars
 Fernanda Montenegro as Dulce Ramirez  
 Maeve Jinkings as Zenaide Sobral Ramirez
 Dionísio Neto as Hélcio Ramirez
 Genézio de Barros as Ademir Ramirez
 Luiz Carlos Vasconcelos as Miroel Matheus
 Jussara Freire as Nilda Matheus
 Álamo Facó as Vicente da Penha Matheus
 Áurea Maranhão as Ticiana da Penha Matheus
 Ismael Caneppele as Murilo Matheus
 Cesar Ferrario as Adão Ramirez Martins
 Maria Sílvia Radomille as Berenice Ramirez Martins
 Berta Loran as Dinorá
 Fernando Eiras as Padre Elias
 Regina Sampaio as Madre Maria
 Cynthia Senek as Edilene Pereira
 Gretchen as Gina
 Emilio Moreira as Aírton Ramirez
 Ana Barroso as Josiane Ramirez
 Patrícia Palhares as Irmã Fátima
 Mirella Sabarense as Child Maria da Paz
 Malu Fernandes as Child Zenaide
 Victor Aguiar as Young Hélcio
 Duda Batista as Child Virgínia
 Maria Clara Baldon as Child Fabiana
 Bernardo Amil as Child Júnior
 Luiz Felipe Melo as Child Chiclete
 Mari Cardoso as Child Josiane
 Luiz Eduardo Toledo as Young Rael
 Leo Scarpa as Child Rock
 Flávio Bisneto as Child Zé Hélio
 Theo Almeida as Child Rarisson
 Alice Jardim as Child Sabrina
 Fátima Bernardes as Herself
 Dudu Bertholini as Himself
 Camila Coutinho as Herself
 Ana Furtado as Gerusa

Production 
The main inspiration for Walcyr was the telenovela Vale Tudo, written by Gilberto Braga, Aguinaldo Silva and Leonor Bassères in 1988, from where he used the story of the bad-natured daughter who steals from her own mother to try to rise socially in Rio de Janeiro. Another reference was the book Mildred Pierce, written by James Cain in 1941, which tells the story of a mother who suffers with her rebellious daughter. The story of the impossible love between Juliana Paes and Marcos Palmeira and the rivalry between the family was inspired by the tragedy of Romeo and Juliet by William Shakespeare. In November 2018, Walcyr Carrasco and Amora Mautner traveled to the interior of Espírito Santo to choose where filming would take place, but the leadership gave up using the state without explanation. Although the fictional city of Rio Vermelho is located in the interior of Espírito Santo, filming was done in Rio Grande do Sul, using the cities of Jaguarão, Nova Esperança do Sul, São Gabriel and Jaguari as scenery.

Originally the telenovela was titled called Dias Felizes, but it was later changed to A Dona do Pedaço (literal translation The Owner of the Piece), to express the struggle for a better life for the main character. Filming of the first phase of the telenovela began on 27 February 2019 and, on 15 March 2019, filming of the second phase began at Estúdios Globo in Rio de Janeiro.

Cast selection 
Juliana Paes, Paolla Oliveira and Reynaldo Gianecchini were reserved for the main roles of the telenovela in October 2018. Bianca Bin was invited to play the antagonist Josiane, repeating the partnership with the author of O Outro Lado do Paraíso, however the actress could only be present in two days of recording per week, and was replaced by actress Agatha Moreira. Invited to play Silvia, Sheron Menezzes preferred to be part of the cast of the telenovela Bom Sucesso, being replaced by Lucy Ramos. Vera Holtz was cast in the role of Dorothea, but the actress was relocated to star in the series Eu, Vó e a Boi after the departure of Susana Vieira, and was replaced by actress Rosi Campos.

Laura Cardoso was announced in the cast in December 2018 and even gave interviews giving details about the character, however, she was replaced by Betty Faria shortly before filming began, since the management feared that the actress's health instability would hamper the progress of the plot. Later, Laura entered the final episodes of the telenovela in the role of Matilde. Marieta Severo refused the role of Beatriz so she could star in the series Filhas da Eva and was replaced by Natália do Vale. Marina Moschen and Bella Piero were considered to play Joana, but Bruna Hamú ended up being cast for the character. Carol Marra auditioned to play Britney, but lost the role for not fitting the ideal profile, Glamour Garcia stayed with the character. Juliano Cazarré was invited to play the character Rael, but he was already booked to work on Amor de Mãe. Rafael Queiroz took the role.

Reception

Ratings

Review

Despite the good audience, the soap opera was criticized several times for underestimating the public's intelligence. The Notícias da TV website evaluated the soap opera with a negative critique: "A Dona do Pedaço enshrines prime-time mediocrity (...) Doubtful plots and incoherent characters have already become common in Globo's 9 pm telenovelas, just as the name of Walcyr Carrasco was already synonymous with good comedies, in the times of O Cravo e a Rosa (2000) and Chocolate com Pimenta (2003). The rural and unpretentious scripts were a success. The change of the author to prime time produced a new type of recognition: he even gets an audience, but his quality has not existed for some time.

Soundtrack

Volume 1

A Dona do Pedaço: Vol. 1 is the first soundtrack of the telenovela, released on 2 June 2019 by Som Livre.

Volume 2

A Dona do Pedaço: Vol. 2 is the second soundtrack of the telenovela, released on 20 June 2019 by Som Livre.

Other songs 
"Bad Guy" by Billie Eilish
"Cadê o Amor?" by Paolo feat. Kell Smith
"California Dreaming" by Bobby Womack
"Conga, Conga, Conga" by Gretchen
"Freak Le Boom Boom" by Gretchen
"Let Me Down Slowly" by Alec Benjamin
"Melô do Piripipi (Je Suis La Femme)" by Gretchen
"O'Death" – Jen Titus
"Reunion" by Bobbie Gentry
"Véu" by Eduardo Queiroz

Awards and nominations

References

External links 
  
 

Telenovelas by Walcyr Carrasco
2019 telenovelas
TV Globo telenovelas
Brazilian telenovelas
2019 Brazilian television series debuts
2019 Brazilian television series endings
Television shows set in São Paulo
Portuguese-language telenovelas
Brazilian LGBT-related television shows
Gay-related television shows
Transgender-related television shows
2010s LGBT-related drama television series
Confectionery in fiction